Daemonorops was a genus of rattan palms in the family Arecaceae. Its species are now included within the genus Calamus.

Species found primarily in the tropics and subtropics of southeastern Asia with a few species extending into southern China and the Himalayas.

Daemonorops species are dioecious, with male and female flowers on separate individuals.

Polysaccharides  found in some Daemonorops species are known for their medicinal anticoagulant properties. 

Dragon's blood, a red resin used traditionally in medicine, varnish, and dyes, may be obtained from the fruit of Daemonorops species.

Former species 

 Daemonorops acamptostachys Becc. – Sarawak
 Daemonorops acehensis Rustiami – Sumatra
 Daemonorops affinis Becc. – Mindanao
 Daemonorops angustifolia (Griff.) Mart. – Thailand, Malaysia
 Daemonorops aruensis Becc. – Aru Islands
 Daemonorops asteracantha Becc. – Borneo
 Daemonorops atra J.Dransf. – Borneo
 Daemonorops aurea Renuka & Vijayak. – Andaman Islands
 Daemonorops banggiensis J.Dransf. – Sabah
 Daemonorops beguinii Burret – Maluku
 Daemonorops binnendijkii Becc. – Sumatra
 Daemonorops brachystachys Furtado – Sumatra, Malaysia
 Daemonorops brevicaulis A.J.Hend. & N.Q.Dung – Vietnam
 Daemonorops calapparia (Mart.) Blume – Maluku
 Daemonorops calicarpa (Griff.) Mart. – Sumatra, Malaysia
 Daemonorops clemensiana Becc. – Mindanao
 Daemonorops collarifera Becc.  – Sarawak
 Daemonorops confusa Furtado – Sumatra
 Daemonorops crinita Blume – Sumatra, Kalimantan
 Daemonorops cristata Becc. – Sarawak
 Daemonorops curranii Becc. – Palawan
 Daemonorops depressiuscula (Miq. ex H.Wendl.) Becc . – Sumatra
 Daemonorops didymophylla Becc. – Thailand, Malaysia, Borneo, Sumatra
 Daemonorops draco (Willd.) Blume, dragon's blood palm – Thailand, Malaysia, Borneo, Sumatra. Synonymous with Calamus draco Willd.
 Daemonorops dracuncula Ridl. – Mentawai
 Daemonorops dransfieldii Rustiami – Sumatra
 Daemonorops elongata Blume – Borneo
 Daemonorops fissa Blume – Borneo
 Daemonorops fissilis (A.J.Hend., N.K.Ban & N.Q.Dung) A.J.Hend. – Vietnam
 Daemonorops forbesii Becc. – Sumatra
 Daemonorops formicaria Becc. – Borneo
 Daemonorops geniculata (Griff.) Mart. – Thailand, Malaysia, Sumatra
 Daemonorops gracilipes (Miq.) Becc. – Sumatra
 Daemonorops gracilis Becc. – Palawan
 Daemonorops grandis (Griff.) Mart. – Thailand, Malaysia = Calamus grandis
 Daemonorops hirsuta Blume – Malaysia, Borneo, Sumatra
 Daemonorops horrida Burret – Sumatra
 Daemonorops ingens J.Dransf. – Borneo
 Calamus jenkinsianus|Daemonorops jenkinsiana (Griff.) Mart. – Guangdong, Guangxi, Hainan, Taiwan, Bangladesh, Bhutan, Cambodia, India, Laos, Myanmar, Nepal, Thailand, Vietnam
 Daemonorops korthalsii Blume – Borneo
 Daemonorops kunstleri Becc. – Thailand, Malaysia
 Daemonorops kurziana Hook.f. ex Becc. – Thailand, Malaysia, Andaman Islands
 Daemonorops lamprolepis Becc. – Sulawesi
 Daemonorops leptopus (Griff.) Mart. – Thailand, Malaysia
 Daemonorops lewisiana (Griff.) Mart. – Thailand, Malaysia, Sumatra
 Daemonorops loheriana Becc. – Philippines
 Daemonorops longipes (Griff.) Mart. – Thailand, Malaysia, Sumatra, Borneo
 Daemonorops longispatha Becc. – Borneo
 Daemonorops longispinosa Burret – Sumatra
 Daemonorops longistipes Burret – Sabah, Sarawak
 Daemonorops macrophylla Becc. – Thailand, Malaysia
 Daemonorops macroptera (Miq.) Becc. – Sulawesi
 Daemonorops maculata J.Dransf. – Sarawak
 Daemonorops manii Becc. – Andaman Islands
 Daemonorops megalocarpa Burret – Sumatra
 Daemonorops melanochaetes Blume – Thailand, Malaysia, Sumatra, Java
 Daemonorops micracantha (Griff.) Becc.  – Malaysia, Borneo
 Daemonorops microcarpa Burret – Sumatra
 Daemonorops microstachys Becc. – Borneo
 Daemonorops mirabilis (Mart.) Mart. – Kalimantan
 Daemonorops mogeana Rustiami – Sulawesi
 Daemonorops mollis (Blanco) Merr. – Philippines
 Daemonorops mollispina J.Dransf. – Vietnam
 Daemonorops monticola (Griff.) Mart. – Thailand, Malaysia
 Daemonorops nigra (Willd.) Blume – Maluku
 Daemonorops nuichuaensis (A.J.Hend., N.K.Ban & N.Q.Dung) A.J.Hend. – Vietnam
 Daemonorops oblata J.Dransf. – Borneo
 Daemonorops oblonga (Reinw. ex Blume) Blume – Java
 Daemonorops ochrolepis Becc. – Philippines
 Daemonorops ocreata A.J.Hend. & N.Q.Dung – Vietnam
 Daemonorops oligolepis Becc. – Mindanao
 Daemonorops oligophylla Becc. – Perak
 Daemonorops oxycarpa Becc. – Borneo
 Daemonorops pachyrostris Becc. – Kalimantan
 Daemonorops palembanica Blume – Sumatra
 Daemonorops pannosa Becc. – Mindanao
 Daemonorops pedicellaris Becc. – Leyte, Mindanao
 Daemonorops periacantha Miq. – Malaysia, Sumatra, Borneo
 Daemonorops plagiocycla Burret – Sumatra
 Daemonorops poilanei J.Dransf. – Vietnam
 Daemonorops polita Fernando – Mindanao
 Daemonorops pumila Van Valk. – Kalimantan
 Daemonorops rarispinosa Renuka & Vijayak. – Andaman Islands
 Daemonorops riedeliana (Miq.) Becc. – Sulawesi
 Daemonorops robusta Warb. ex Becc. – Sulawesi, Maluku
 Daemonorops rubra (Reinw. ex Mart.) Blume – Java
 Daemonorops ruptilis Becc. – Borneo
 Daemonorops sabut Becc. – Malaysia, Sumatra, Borneo, Thailand
 Daemonorops sarasinorum Warb. ex Becc. – Sulawesi
 Daemonorops scapigera Becc. – Johor, Borneo, Natuna Islands, Sumatra
 Daemonorops schlechteri Burret – Sulawesi
 Daemonorops sekundurensis Rustiami & Zumaidar – Sumatra
 Daemonorops sepal Becc. – Malaysia, Thailand
 Daemonorops serpentina J.Dransf. – Sabah
 Daemonorops siberutensis Rustiami – Siberut
 Daemonorops singalana Becc. – Sumatra
 Daemonorops sparsiflora Becc. – Borneo
 Daemonorops spectabilis Becc. – Borneo
 Daemonorops stenophylla Becc. – Sumatra
 Daemonorops takanensis Rustiami – Sulawesi
 Daemonorops treubiana Becc. – described 1911 from material collected in unknown location; probably extinct
 Daemonorops trichroa Miq. – Sumatra
 Daemonorops unijuga J.Dransf. – Sarawak
 Daemonorops urdanetana Becc. – Mindanao
 Daemonorops uschdraweitiana Burret – Sumatra
 Daemonorops verticillaris (Griff.) Mart. – Malaysia, Thailand, Sumatra
 Daemonorops wrightmyoensis Renuka & Vijayak. – Andaman Islands

References 

Calamoideae
Historically recognized angiosperm genera
Dioecious plants